China Express Airlines is a regional airline with its corporate headquarters on the grounds of Chongqing Jiangbei International Airport, Chongqing, China.

History
China Express Airlines, also known as Huaxia Airlines, is China's first private regional airline. The airline was established in May 2006 and is owned by Cathay Fortune (40%), High Zero (25%), Tampines International (24%) and others (11%).
 
On August 28, 2010, a China Express Airlines Bombardier Bombardier CRJ200 regional jet scraped the ground on landing at Guiyang Airport in southwest China. No one was injured during the incident. On 1 September 2010, China's Civil Aviation Administration ordered the airline to suspend operations after a landing incident at Guiyang Longdongbao International Airport in which an aircraft's right wing made contact with the runway during landing.  The airline was ordered to review its safety regulations and perform an investigation into the incident. On 6 September, Chinese authorities allowed the airline to resume partial operations; according to a spokesperson, the company planned to resume full operations within two weeks.

Corporate affairs
The airline was previously headquartered on the grounds of Chongqing Jiangbei International Airport in Chongqing.

Fleet

, China Express Airlines fleet consists of the following aircraft:
 

In October 2011, China Express signed a conditional order for six CRJ900 NextGen aircraft with an option for an additional five. The deal was announced on February 10, 2012. On July 7, 2012, the conditional order was converted into a firm order.

In 2014 the airline signed a deal for a further 16 Bombardier CRJ900 aircraft (including 8 options).

On April 30, 2015, China Express retired its final CRJ 200 with the last flight from Shanghai Pudong International Airport to Chongqing Jiangbei International Airport operating as flight G52006. On December 31, 2015, the company exercised eight of its options and placed a firm order for 10 CRJ 900.

References

External links

China Express Airlines

Airlines established in 2006
Airlines of China
Chinese companies established in 2006
Companies based in Chongqing
Regional airlines